Phùng Chí Kiên  is an urban ward (phường) of Bắc Kạn, Bắc Kạn Province, in Vietnam. The ward is named after revolutionist Nguyễn Thị Minh Khai.

Populated places in Bắc Kạn province
Communes of Bắc Kạn province
Bắc Kạn